The Stadsaal Caves (or Stadtsaal) are located in the Cederberg, South Africa.
The caves were used for shelter in prehistoric times, and ancient rock art paintings can be seen.

History
The caves are estimated to be about 1,000 years old.

See also
List of caves in South Africa

References

External links
Stadsaal Caves

Caves of South Africa
Archaeological sites in South Africa